Corrado Gabriele (born November 1966, Napoli) is an Italian politician. He was a member of the European Parliament from May 8, 2006, when he took up a seat vacated after the 2006 Italian general election, until June 19 in the same year. He represented the Communist Refoundation Party within the European United Left–Nordic Green Left parliamentary group.

External links 
 Personal website 

1966 births
Living people
Communist Refoundation Party MEPs
MEPs for Italy 1994–1999
Communist Refoundation Party politicians